Sphaerochitina is an extinct genus of chitinozoans. It was described by Alfred Eisenack in 1955.

Species
 Sphaerochitina acanthifera (Eisenack, 1955)
 Sphaerochitina concava Laufeld, 1974
 Sphaerochitina dubia Eisenack, 1968
 Sphaerochitina impia Laufeld, 1974
 Sphaerochitina indecora Nestor, 1982
 Sphaerochitina lycoperdoides Laufeld, 1974
 Sphaerochitina scanicus Grahn, 1996
 Sphaerochitina sphaerocephala (Eisenack, 1932)

References

Prehistoric marine animals
Fossil taxa described in 1955